10 år bakåt & 100 år framåt is a compilation album by the Swedish band bob hund. The album comprises two discs – the first one with B-sides and other songs that cannot be found on the groups' studio albums, the second one with a live recording from London on 23 May 2001.

Track listing

Disc One

Disc Two

Bob Hund live albums
2002 live albums
2002 compilation albums
Silence Records compilation albums
Swedish-language live albums
Swedish-language compilation albums
Silence Records live albums
Bob Hund compilation albums